"Sucker for Pain" is a song by American rappers Lil Wayne and Wiz Khalifa and American band Imagine Dragons, with fellow American rapper Logic and American singer Ty Dolla $ign featuring fellow American band X Ambassadors. The song was released as a single for the motion picture soundtrack for Suicide Squad (2016) on June 24, 2016, by Atlantic Records. On the same day, the official music video was uploaded to Atlantic Records' YouTube channel.

Critical reception 
Elias Leight of Rolling Stone called the song "loopy" and praised Lil Wayne's contribution to the song, saying "Wayne shines during his verse, delivering self-destructive rhymes while skipping nimbly around the plodding beat". Carly Mallenbaum of USA Today felt that the song is "sexy".

Commercial performance 
In North America, the song reached number 15 on the US Billboard Hot 100 chart and number 3 on the Hot R&B/Hip-Hop Songs.

Track listings

Charts

Weekly charts

Year-end charts

Decade-end charts

Certifications

Release history

References

2016 singles
2016 songs
Lil Wayne songs
Wiz Khalifa songs
Imagine Dragons songs
Logic (rapper) songs
Ty Dolla Sign songs
X Ambassadors songs
Songs written for films
Songs written by Lil Wayne
Songs written by Wiz Khalifa
Songs written by Wayne Sermon
Songs written by Dan Reynolds (musician)
Songs written by Daniel Platzman
Songs written by Ben McKee
DC Extended Universe music
Songs written by Logic (rapper)
Rap rock songs
Alternative hip hop songs
Songs written by Alex da Kid
Song recordings produced by Alex da Kid
Songs written by Ty Dolla Sign
Atlantic Records singles